Plesiocystiscus aphanospira is a species of sea snail, a marine gastropod mollusk, in the family Cystiscidae.

References

aphanospira
Gastropods described in 1913